The Killer Eye is a 1999 American science fiction horror film and monster movie, directed by David DeCoteau under the pseudonym of Richard Chasen. The film was released on January 18, 1999 through Full Moon Features and was followed by a 2011 sequel, Killer Eye: Halloween Haunt. It stars Jonathan Norman as a mad scientist that unwittingly unleashes a killer eyeball upon the world.

Plot
Dr. Jordan Grady (Jonathan Norman) hires a kid off the street, Japlo (Ryan Van Steenis), to participate in an experiment. He administers special eye drops to Japlo in an attempt to allow him to see into the eighth dimension. During the test, Jordan is confronted by his wife Rita (Jacqueline Lovell) about his neglect of her and while he is away, Japlo's eye is possessed by a creature from the eighth dimension, killing him. Rita goes next door to have sex with her neighbors, Joe (Roland Martinez) and Tom (Dave Oren Ward), while Jordan finds Japlo's body. Jordan demands that his employee Morton (Costas Koromilas) help him, ruining Morton's date with his wife Jane (Nanette Bianchi).

Japlo's eye has morphed into a massive monster that rapes Rita and Jane. Jordan and Morton put Japlo's body in the attic, and the body is found by Jordan's other employee Bill (Blake Adams). Jordan and Morton hunt for the eye, and both Morton and Jane are hypnotized by the eye in their bedroom. Morton partly undresses Jane and himself and lays her out on the bed for the eye, which violates her while he eagerly watches and masturbates. However, Morton accidentally knocks over a lamp behind him which shines a light into the eye; it is hurt and runs away, snapping the couple out of their trances. Jordan, Rita, Bill and Morton regroup and realize that light weakens the eye. Jordan hypothesizes that because the monster has been deprived of brain matter, the eye requires regular contact with a brain, which explains the victims' wounds. He also states that the eye could be harmed by shining bright light into it, just like a normal-sized human eye. However, the eye possesses Joe and causes him to sexually assault Jane, but he suddenly dies due to having his brain matter drained by the eye.

The building's lights go off due to a power outage, so the group turns on a backup generator to power lights in their efforts against the eye. The eye attacks Rita when she gets separated from the others. Jordan appears, revealing that he wants to help the eye because it is advanced and intelligent. Rita manages to escape before she can be consumed, but Tom and Bill are murdered by the eye. Morton is able to trap the eye and forces it to go back home, but Jordan follows it back to the eighth dimension. Rita, Morton, and Jane think they are safe, but Rita and Jane feel sudden abdominal pain, implying that they were impregnated by the eye and ending the film on a cliffhanger.

Cast
Jacqueline Lovell as Rita Grady
Jonathan Norman as Dr. Jordan Grady
Nanette Bianchi as Jane
Costas Koromilas as Morton
Blake Adams as Creepy Bill (as Blake Bailey)
Ryan Van Steenis as Japlo
Dave Oren Ward as Tom
Roland Martinez as Joe

Reception
The A.V. Club gave a mixed review, writing "for all of The Killer Eye's faults, hardly anyone other than Full Moon Features, the studio behind the Puppet Master and Subspecies series, knows how to churn out cut-rate monster movies these days. And if that's your pleasure, excessively creepy sex scenes aside, you might enjoy The Killer Eye." In his 2010 book 150 Movies You Should Die Before You See, author Steve Miller panned The Killer Eye and stated "Nothing works in this picture, from the poorly structured story to the sparsely decorated sets."

References

External links

1999 horror films
1999 films
1990s monster movies
1990s science fiction horror films
American pregnancy films
American science fiction horror films
Films about parallel universes
Films about rape
Films about hypnosis
Puppet films
Full Moon Features films
Mad scientist films
Adultery in films
Human eyes in culture
1990s English-language films
1990s American films